The United Lutheran Mission Association (ULMA) is a Lutheran church organization.

History
The United Lutheran Mission Association was established at a meeting in Chicago on July 16, 2005. There, representatives of two congregations that were formerly members of the Lutheran Church–Missouri Synod (LCMS), namely, Pilgrim Lutheran Church of Decatur, Illinois and Redeemer Lutheran Church of St. Clair Shores, Michigan, began work on establishing Confessional Lutheran congregations in the United States. A third congregation, Our Redeemer Lutheran Church of Forsyth, Illinois, joined on December 15, 2011. As of 2021, the ULMA has one mission congregation: Christ the Rock Lutheran Church of Carlsbad, California, whose first service was February 8, 2009. Agnus Dei in King George, Virginia, was a former mission whose first service was in December, 2007. Agnus Dei is in fellowship with the Association, but is not a member of the Association. This change occurred in 2017 when the mission became self-sustaining.

Structure
The ULMA, like the Protes'tant Conference, is congregationalist in polity. The voters assembly is the supreme authority in the congregation. There is no central office or centralized organizational structure other than the individual representatives who meet twice each year. The ULMA plans to train its own pastors at Walther Theological Seminary, but as of 2016 had only one graduate. The ULMA has obtained clergy trained in the seminaries of other Lutheran denominations, such as the LCMS, the Wisconsin Evangelical Lutheran Synod, and the Evangelical Lutheran Synod.

References

External links
 

Lutheran denominations in North America
Christian organizations established in 2005
Lutheran organizations established in the 21st century